Marjorie Merriweather Post (March 15, 1887 – September 12, 1973) was an American businesswoman, socialite, and philanthropist. She was also the owner of General Foods Corporation.

Post used much of her fortune to collect art, particularly Imperial-era Russian art, much of which is now on display at Hillwood, the museum which was her estate in Washington, D.C. She is also known for her mansion, Mar-a-Lago, in Palm Beach, Florida.

Early life
Marjorie Merriweather Post was born in Springfield, Illinois, the daughter and only child of C. W. Post and the former Ella Letitia Merriweather. At age 27, following her father's death in 1914, she became the owner of the rapidly growing Postum Cereal Company, founded in 1895. She was subsequently the wealthiest woman in the United States, inheriting US$20 million (equivalent to US$526 million in 2020).

Post attended the Mount Vernon Seminary and College (now the George Washington University's Mount Vernon Campus). She maintained a close lifelong relationship with her alma mater and served as its first alumna trustee. Today, a collection of her correspondence with Mount Vernon administrators is maintained by GWU's Special Collections Research Center. Post's complete collection of personal papers, as well as those of her father, are held by the University of Michigan's Bentley Historical Library.

General Foods Corporation 
Post became the owner of Postum Cereal Company in 1914, after the death of her father, and was a director of the company until 1958. She, along with her second husband, E.F. Hutton, began expanding the business and acquiring other American food companies such as Hellmann's Mayonnaise, Jell-O, Baker's Chocolate, Maxwell House, and many more. In 1929, Postum Cereal Company was renamed General Foods Corporation.

While taking a voyage on her yacht, the Hussar, she came across the innovations of Clarence Birdseye in Gloucester, Massachusetts. Birdseye had developed a new way to preserve food by freezing it. Post foresaw the future advantages of frozen food, and bought Birdseye's company, which eventually became a success.

Philanthropy 
Post funded a U.S. Army hospital in France during World War I, and, decades later, the French government awarded her the Legion of Honour, in the degree of Commander. Starting in 1929 and throughout the Great Depression, she financed and personally supervised a Salvation Army feeding station in New York. She also donated the cost of the Boy Scouts of America headquarters in Washington. Years later in 1971, she was among the first three recipients of the Silver Fawn Award, presented by the Boy Scouts of America. The 425-acre (172 ha) Lake Merriweather at Goshen Scout Reservation in Goshen, Virginia, was named in her honor.

In 1966, at Long Island University's C.W. Post College, located on her former Long Island estate, she became honorary housemother of Zeta Beta Tau's Gamma Delta chapter, often hosting the fraternity brothers for brunches. Post served as the honorary house mother of the college's first local fraternity, Sigma Beta Epsilon, which, in 1969, became the New York Beta chapter of Sigma Alpha Epsilon. Since Post had borne only girls, she referred to the fraternity of sons-in-law as her "boys", while they called her "Mother Marjorie". Post was honored by Sigma Alpha Epsilon fraternity as a "Golden Daughter of Minerva".

She donated $100,000 to the National Cultural Center in Washington that would later become the John F. Kennedy Center for the Performing Arts. In 1955, she contributed $100,000 to the National Symphony for free concerts that led to the beginning of the Music for Young America Concerts, which she financed annually. The Merriweather Post Pavilion, an outdoor concert venue in Columbia, Maryland, is named for her.

Lifestyle

Jewelry 
Some of Post's jewelry, bequeathed to the Smithsonian Institution in Washington, D.C., is displayed in the Harry Winston exhibit. Pieces in the collection include the Napoleon Diamond Necklace and the Marie Louise Diadem, a 275-ct (55 g) diamond-and-turquoise necklace and tiara set that Napoleon I gave to his second wife, Empress Marie Louise; the Marie Antoinette Diamond Earrings, a pair of diamond earrings set with pear shapes, weighing 14 ct (2.8 g) and 20 ct (4 g), once belonging to Marie Antoinette; the Blue Heart Diamond, a 30.82-ct (6.164 g) heart-shaped blue diamond ring; and an emerald-and-diamond necklace and ring, once belonging to Habsburg aristocrat and one time emperor of Mexico, Maximilian.

Russian art collection
According to the Hermitage Museum Foundation, Post was a Russophile. During the 1930s, the Soviet government under Joseph Stalin began selling art treasures and other valuables seized from the Romanov family and former Russian aristocrats after the Russian Revolution to earn hard currency for its industrialization and military armament programs. Critics  have claimed that these items were expropriated; however, the transactions by Post and her third husband, Joseph E. Davies, were from the recognized governmental authority. Neither Post nor Davies were involved with the original seizing of the items. Allegations later surfaced that many works of art from the Tretyakov Gallery and other collections were either donated or offered at nominal prices to the couple, who were both art collectors. Davies is also alleged to have purchased art expropriated from Soviet citizens well after the Russian Revolution, including victims of Stalin's Terror at discount prices from Soviet authorities.

Many of the items, which remain under the control of the Post estate or its agents, can be viewed at Hillwood, her former estate. Hillwood has operated as a private museum since Post's death and displays her French and Russian art collection, featuring the work of Fabergé, Sèvres porcelain, French furniture, tapestries, and paintings.

Notable residences 
 Mar-a-Lago, Palm Beach, Florida: Designed by Marion Sims Wyeth and Joseph Urban, Post willed Mar-a-Lago to the United States federal government in 1973 as a retreat for presidents and visiting foreign dignitaries. The mansion was not, however, used for this purpose, prior to being declared a National Historic Landmark in 1980.
 Hillwood (Washington, D.C.): now operates as a private museum since Post's death and displays her French and Russian art collection, featuring the work of Fabergé, Sèvres porcelain, French furniture, tapestries, and paintings.
 Camp Topridge, Upper St. Regis Lake, New York: a "rustic retreat" in the Adirondack Mountains. It included a fully staffed main lodge and private guest cabins, each staffed with its own butler. The expansive Great Camp, built in 1923 by Benjamin A. Muncil, eventually contained nearly 70 buildings, as well as a Russian dacha, on 300 acres. It was one of only two Adirondack camps to be featured in Life magazine.
 Sea Cloud (Hussar V): a yacht that was personally designed by Post, and built as a replacement for the original yacht Hussar IV for her and her second husband, E. F. Hutton, in 1931. It was the largest privately owned sea-going yacht in the world at the time. They traveled the world on it for portions of the year with their daughter Nedenia. After her divorce from Hutton, she renamed the yacht Sea Cloud, and continued to sail it with her new husband Joseph E. Davies for his ambassadorial trips to the Soviet Union. She sold the yacht in 1955 to the President of the Dominican Republic, Rafael Trujillo; it is now a cruise ship.
 Hillwood (Long Island): Built in 1922 in Brookville, New York, after Post purchased and greatly altered the former Warburton Hall Estate, it was designed in the Tudor revival style by architect Charles Mansfield Hart. Post sold it in 1951 to Long Island University, and the property later become LIU Post. In 2005, it was restored and renamed Winnick House and is used for campus administration, academic offices and event space.

Personal life

Marriages 
Edward Bennett Close: In 1905, Post married investment banker Edward Bennett Close of Greenwich, Connecticut. They divorced in 1919. Together, they had two daughters:
 Adelaide Brevoort Close (1908–1998), who married three times, to Thomas Wells Durant, Merrall MacNeille, and Augustus Riggs IV.
 Eleanor Post Close (1909–2006), later known in the media as "Eleanor Post Hutton", married six times, to film director Preston Sturges, Etienne Marie Robert Gautier, George Curtis Rand, Hans Habe, Owen D. Johnson (son of author Owen Johnson), and orchestra conductor Léon Barzin.
Via his second marriage, Edward Bennett Close would later become the paternal grandfather of actress Glenn Close.

Edward Francis Hutton: Post was married for a second time, in 1920, to financier Edward Francis Hutton. In 1923, he became the chairman of the board of the Postum Cereal Company. Together they developed a larger variety of food products, including Birdseye Frozen Foods. The company became the General Foods Corporation in 1929. Post and Hutton divorced in 1935. They had one daughter:
 Nedenia Marjorie Hutton (1923–2017), better known as the actress Dina Merrill.

Joseph E. Davies: In 1935, Post married her third husband, Joseph E. Davies, a Washington, D.C., lawyer. They had no children and were divorced in 1955. From 1937 to 1938, in a crucial period leading up to World War II, Davies served as the American ambassador to the Soviet Union, ruled at that time by Joseph Stalin. During this time, Davies and Post acquired many valuable Russian works of art from Soviet authorities.

Herbert A. May: Post's final marriage, in 1958, was to Herbert A. May, a wealthy Pittsburgh businessman and the former master of fox hounds of the Rolling Rock Hunt Club in Ligonier, Pennsylvania. That marriage ended in divorce in May 1964 and she subsequently reclaimed the name Marjorie Merriweather Post.

Death 
Post died at her Hillwood estate in Washington, D.C., on September 12, 1973 after a long illness, and was buried there. She left the bulk of her estate to her three daughters, Adelaide Close, Eleanor Post Close and Nedenia Hutton.

In popular culture
Merriweather Post was portrayed by Ann Harding in the 1943 film Mission to Moscow, a fictionalization of her third husband, Joseph E. Davies's book detailing his time as Ambassador to the Soviet Union.

, a film based on The New York Times feature "Mystery on Fifth Avenue", describing a riddle-laden renovation of a triplex undertaken by Eric Clough and the architectural firm 212box, built for Marjorie Merriweather Post in the 1920s, was in development by J. J. Abrams.

Merriweather Post was played by Anne Francis in the 1987 miniseries Poor Little Rich Girl: The Barbara Hutton Story.

Merriweather Post is portrayed by Morgan Bradley in the History Channel series, The Food that Built America.

Legacy
Merriweather Post Pavilion in Columbia, Maryland is named in her honor because of her years of sustained financial support for the National Symphony.

See also 
 Close City, Texas, named for E.B. Close
 Post Cereals
 Post, Texas
 Merriweather Post Pavillion

Notes

References

External links
 Guide to the Mount Vernon Seminary and College Collection of Biographical Materials and Correspondence with Marjorie Merriweather Post, 1901-1999, Special Collections Research Center, Estelle and Melvin Gelman Library, The George Washington University
 Finding Aid for the Post Family Papers, 1882-1973, Bentley Historical Library, University of Michigan
 
 

1887 births
1973 deaths
20th-century art collectors
20th-century American philanthropists
American art collectors
American socialites
Daughters of the American Revolution people
Hutton family
Mount Vernon Seminary and College alumni
People from Brookville, New York
People from Palm Beach, Florida
People from Springfield, Illinois
Philanthropists from Illinois
Philanthropists from New York (state)
Recipients of the Legion of Honour
Women art collectors
Post Holdings
General Foods
People from Washington, D.C.